Italian supercentenarians are citizens, residents or emigrants from Italy who have attained or surpassed 110 years of age. , the Gerontology Research Group (GRG) had validated the longevity claims of 151 Italian supercentenarians, the majority of whom were women. The oldest Italian ever is Emma Morano, who was also the last living person born before the year 1900.

100 oldest known Italians

Biographies

Antonio Todde 
Antonio Todde (22 January 1889 – 3 January 2002) was an Italian supercentenarian who, at the time of his death just a few days shy of his 113th birthday, was the oldest man in the world. Todde was born in the village of Tiana, in the province of Nuoro, Sardinia, an area noted for its centenarian density. Born to a poor shepherd family in the medieval center of Tiana, Todde was the third of 12 children. In 1920, at age 31, he married Maria Antonia, then aged 25, and they had four daughters and a son. She died in 1990, aged 95. He left Sardinia only to fight in the First World War, where he was injured in the shoulder by a grenade. He died at age 112 years and 346 days on 3 January 2002.

Venere Pizzinato 

Venere Ires Pizzinato (married Papo; 23 November 1896 – 2 August 2011) was an Italian supercentenarian who lived for 114 years and 252 days. At the time of her death she was the oldest person ever from Italy, and the world's third oldest living person. Pizzinato was also the oldest person ever to have been born in the Austro-Hungarian empire.

She was born in Ala, Trentino, then part of the Austro-Hungarian empire, on 23 November 1896. In 1902, the family moved to Verona, where they had relatives. In 1903, they moved back to Trentino, where Pizzinato attended a boarding school in Trento. World War I forced her to take refuge in Bazzano, Bologna. After the war, she moved to Milan, where she took Italian citizenship and met her future husband Isidoro Papo. During the outbreak of the Second World War, in 1939, the couple moved to Nice, France, to escape the Fascist regime of Benito Mussolini. They married in France, and after the war they moved back to Milan. Upon retirement in 1964, they finally settled in Verona. Mr. Papo died in 1981. Pizzinato remained in Verona for the rest of her life, spending her final years in a retirement home.

On 23 November 2010, marking her 114th birthday, Pizzinato was visited by Italy's president, Giorgio Napolitano, who wrote her a congratulatory letter.

Marie-Josephine Gaudette 
Marie-Josephine Clarice Gaudette (25 March 1902 – 13 July 2017) was the oldest living Italian from the death of Emma Morano on 15 April 2017 until her own death three months later. Born in Manchester, New Hampshire, she was also the oldest living person born in the United States from May 2016 to July 2017.

A nun known as Mother Cecilia, she lived in Canada and France before settling in Rome. She lived at the Convento di Gesù e Maria from 1958 until her death, and was considered "the world's oldest nun". Gaudette died on 13 July 2017, aged 115 years and 110 days, as the 5th-oldest living person in the world.

Giuseppina Projetto 
Giuseppina Projetto (married Frau; 30 May 1902 – 6 July 2018) was, at age 116 years and 37 days, the oldest living person in Italy from the death of Marie Josephine Gaudette on 13 July 2017, and the world's second-oldest verified living person upon the death of Nabi Tajima on 21 April 2018, until her own death on 6 July 2018.

She was born in La Maddalena, but was of Sicilian origin. Her maternal grandfather had moved from Sicily with the expedition of Giuseppe Garibaldi. In 1946, she married Giuseppe Frau, a widower with three children. At the time of her death, Projetto lived in Tuscany with her daughter-in-law and grandchildren.

Notes

References 

 
Supercentenarians
Italian